Ten ships of the French Navy have borne the name Junon, in honour of Juno:

 , a 44-gun two-decked ship ("partly ship of the line, partly frigate")
 , a 32-gun 
 , a 14-gun corvette
 , a 40-gun 
  (1797), a Venetian galley
 , a  40-gun frigate.
  (1814), a 46-gun frigate renamed Junon in 1814
 , a 28-gun frigate begun as a sailing frigate but launched as a steam frigate
 , a Minerve-class submarine of 1935

French Navy ship names